Wallpaper is a material used in interior decoration to decorate the interior walls of domestic and public buildings. Historically, wallpaper has been manufactured by both individual printmakers and companies. This list includes both, arranged by country of origin.

France 
 Defossé & Karth
 Jacquemart & Bérnard
 Jean-Baptiste Réveillon
 Joseph Dufour et Cie
 Jourdan et Villard
 Paul Balin
 Zuber & Cie

Germany 
 Marburger Tapetenfabrik

India 
 D'decor

United Kingdom 
 Muraspec 
 Arthur Sanderson & Sons
 Coloroll
 Crown Wallpaper
 de Gournay
 Hammer Prints Limited
 Jeffrey & Co
 Morris & Co.
 Walker Greenbank

United States 
 Adrian Janes
 Lightbown Aspinall
 Osborne & Little
 Robert Graves Company

Wallpaper